NDTV India (styled as NDTV इंडिया) is a Hindi news channel in India owned by New Delhi Television Limited.

In June 2016, NDTV decided to launch two separate channels called NDTV India and NDTV Spice in the United Kingdom.

History 
NDTV was the brainchild of its chairman, Prannoy Roy, and his wife and managing director, Radhika Roy. In 1988, NDTV produced the news and current affairs show The World This Week for Doordarshan. The show proved to be popular and NDTV established its image as a private news producer. It moved on to become the sole news content provider and producer for India’s first 24-hour news channel, Star News. On 15 April 2003, they launched two 24-hour news channels—NDTV 24x7 in English and NDTV India in Hindi.

Telecast ban 
In January 2016, the channel received notice from the Information and Broadcasting ministry over its coverage of the Pathankot terrorist attack for allegedly violating norms. On 4 January 2016, while Indian security forces were still under the counter operations against the terrorist attack committed on 2 January 2016 at the Pathankot Air Force Station, NDTV India's telecast between 1225 and 1231 hours (IST) had allegedly revealed "strategically-sensitive information". On 2 November 2016, the committee set up by the ministry ordered a blackout of the channel on 9 November 2016, prohibiting "transmission or re-transmission for one day on any platform throughout India". The order also stated that NDTV had revealed strategically-sensitive information related to the positions of ammunition and armaments at the airbase along with locations of schools and residential areas in the vicinity, thus endangering civilian lives. The coverage was deemed in violation of the Cable TV Network Rules, 1994 that prevent live coverage of anti-terrorist operations.

After the channel decided to move to the Supreme Court against the order, got a date of hearing on 5 November 2016, and seemed to receive support from public over social media and through protests, the government surprisingly put its orders regarding blackout on hold just before the hearing.

Censorship 
Journalists at NDTV have said they face intimidation aimed at stopping them from running stories critical of Prime Minister Narendra Modi.

Associated journalists

 Manoranjan Bharti
 Kamal Khan
 Manish Kumar
 Nidhi Kulpati
 Sanket Upadhyay
 Akhilesh Sharma
 Anurag Dwary
 Nehal Kidwai
 Himanshu Shekhar Mishra
 Neeta Sharma
 Kadambini Sharma
 Naghma Sehar
 Sharad Sharma
 Mukesh Singh Senger
 Ravish Ranjan Shukla
 Saurabh Shukla
 Puja Bharadwaj
 Parimal Kumar
 Aditi Rajputana

References

External links 
 About NDTV India
 Hindi News

24-hour television news channels in India
NDTV Group
Television channels and stations established in 2003
Television stations in New Delhi
Hindi-language television channels in India